Glaybson Yago Souza Lisboa (born 5 June 1992), known as Yago Pikachu, is a Brazilian professional footballer who plays as a winger for Brasileirao club Fortaleza EC, on loan from J2 League Shimizu S-Pulse.

Club career

Paysandu
Born in Belém, Pará, Yago Pikachu joined Paysandu's youth setup in 2005 at the age of 13, after starting it out at Tuna Luso. He earned the nickname Pikachu for his short stature and speed. After being promoted to the main squad, he made his senior debut on 14 January 2012, starting in a 1–2 Campeonato Paraense home loss against Cametá.

Yago Pikachu scored his first senior goal on 25 January, netting the first in a 1–2 away loss against Águia de Marabá. He finished the tournament with four goals, and also scored regularly in the year's Série C, as his side returned to Série B after six years.

Yago Pikachu made his debut in the second division on 25 May 2013, starting in a 1–1 home draw against ASA. He scored his first goal in the category six days later, netting the first against América-RN which ended in the same scoreline.

Despite scoring nine goals, Yago Pikachu could not avoid his team's relegation as it finished 18th. He again helped the side in its promotion the following year, contributing with four goals in 22 matches.

On 12 June 2015 Yago Pikachu scored an olympic goal in a 2–0 away win against ABC. He completed 200 games for Paysandu on 15 August, but in a 3–1 home win against Oeste.

Vasco da Gama
On 16 December 2015, Yago Pikachu signed a three-year deal with fellow second-tier club Vasco da Gama. Mainly used as a substitute in the midfield during the year, he contributed with three goals in 27 matches as his side achieved promotion to Série A.

Yago Pikachu made his top tier debut on 14 May 2017, starting in a 4–0 away loss against Palmeiras. Seven days later he scored his first goal in the division, netting the opener in a 2–0 home win against Bahia. He completed the 2017 season with two goals in 27 games.

Career statistics

Honours
Paysandu
Campeonato Paraense: 2013

Vasco da Gama
Campeonato Carioca: 2016

Fortaleza
Campeonato Cearense: 2021, 2022
Copa do Nordeste: 2022

Individual
Campeonato Carioca Team of the Year: 2018
Campeonato Brasileiro Série A Team or the Year: 2021

References

External links

1992 births
Living people
Sportspeople from Belém
Brazilian footballers
Association football fullbacks
Association football midfielders
Campeonato Brasileiro Série A players
Campeonato Brasileiro Série B players
Campeonato Brasileiro Série C players
Paysandu Sport Club players
CR Vasco da Gama players
Fortaleza Esporte Clube players
Brazilian expatriate sportspeople in Japan
Expatriate footballers in Japan
J1 League players
Shimizu S-Pulse players